Knox County Courthouse may refer to:

 Knox County Courthouse (Galesburg, Illinois)
 Knox County Courthouse (Knoxville, Illinois)
 Knox County Courthouse (Kentucky), Barbourville, Kentucky
 Knox County Courthouse (Maine), Rockland, Maine
 Knox County Courthouse (Nebraska), Center, Nebraska
 Knox County Courthouse (Ohio), Mount Vernon, Ohio
 Knox County Courthouse (Tennessee), Knoxville, Tennessee
 Knox County Courthouse (Texas), Benjamin, Texas